Droid Assault is a top-down scrolling shooter video game developed and published by Puppy Games and released on May 2, 2008 for Windows, Mac OS X, and Linux.

The game received mixed reviews from critics, praising its art style and gameplay but calling its length short.

Gameplay 
Droid Assault is heavily based on the gameplay of Paradroid. The game takes place in what is implied to be a spaceship where the player controls a basic model of robot. The player must take control of other robots in order to progress, but only if they have enough "transfer points" to hack into them. The old model then turns into an AI follower of the player and automatically targets enemies. The player can then change between any of the droids in their "robot army" at no cost. Ultimately, the player must face off against a boss robot that is stronger than usual.

Plot 
The game lacks a story, but its setting is implied through textual descriptions of the various droids. The game takes place sometime in the future, with the droids being used for purposes ranging from civilian to military.

Reception 
Droid Assault received mixed reviews from critics.

Silviu Stahie of Softpedia gave the game an 85/100, calling the concept "interesting" and the graphics beautiful, saying the only con was that sometimes the action on screen became too hectic.

Michael Krosta of 4Players gave the game a 66/100, concluding the game is "pleasantly" fast-paced and that the graphics are charming, but said that the levels became repetitive and the game itself didn't last long before its charm wore off.

Alec Meer of Rock, Paper, Shotgun called the game "more than enough pixel-robot goodness for the price" and a "defiantly old-school affair".

Totalbiscuit called the game "super fun" and "strongly recommended" the game in a review, though he criticized the control scheme as in need of improvement.

References

External links 
 Official site

2008 video games
Windows games
MacOS games
Linux games
Retro-style video games
Science fiction games
Scrolling shooters
Indie video games
Video games about robots
Video games developed in the United Kingdom
Puppy Games games